Do Re Creativa TV was a  programadora television production company based in Colombia.

History
It operated from August 1979 to the end of 1991. It was created and owned by Jimmy Salcedo.

Programming
Do Re Creativa TV was allotted 1 1/2 hours of programming a week. Its main program was El show de Jimmy, which had been previously presented under the auspices of Producciones PUNCH and was presented from 1992 to 1993, after Do Re Creativa ceased operations, by TeVecine.

Television production companies of Colombia
Mass media companies established in 1979
Mass media companies disestablished in 1991
1979 establishments in Colombia
1991 disestablishments in Colombia